The West Australian State Premiership was an Australian rules football match contested intermittently between 1902 and 1924 between the premiers of the Western Australian Football Association / West Australian Football League (WAFA / WAFL) and the Goldfields Football Association / Goldfields Football League (GFA / GFL).

List of winners
 won the most championships overall, winning five: 1902, 1904, 1906, 1909 and 1910:

See also
Australian rules football in the Goldfields region of Western Australia
Australian rules football in Western Australia
Tasmanian State Premiership, a similar competition held in Tasmania from 1904–78

Notes

References

Australian rules football competitions in Western Australia
Australian rules football in Western Australia
Recurring sporting events established in 1902